Dirk Bremser (born 1 October 1965) is a German football coach of Holstein Kiel and a former player.

Career
Bremser spent two seasons in the Bundesliga with MSV Duisburg and Bayer 05 Uerdingen.

Coaching career
In the 2006–07 he was a caretaker manager for Alemannia Aachen for a few days, coaching them in the DFB-Pokal game against Chemnitzer FC. He was announced as the interim head coach for Holstein Kiel on 20 September 2021.

Career statistics

References

External links

German footballers
Bundesliga players
2. Bundesliga players
VfL Bochum players
VfL Bochum II players
MSV Duisburg players
KFC Uerdingen 05 players
SC Preußen Münster players
Hertha BSC players
VfB Lübeck players
Holstein Kiel players
German football managers
Alemannia Aachen managers
1965 births
Living people
VfB Lübeck managers
Holstein Kiel managers
2. Bundesliga managers
Sportspeople from Bochum
Association football midfielders
Footballers from North Rhine-Westphalia
Hannover 96 non-playing staff
Hamburger SV non-playing staff
Borussia Mönchengladbach non-playing staff
VfL Wolfsburg non-playing staff
VfB Lübeck non-playing staff